Locust Valley is a station along the Oyster Bay Branch of the Long Island Rail Road. It is located at Birch Hill Road and Piping Rock Road, south of Forest Avenue, Locust Valley, New York.

History

Locust Valley station was opened on April 19, 1869 and was the terminus of the line until 1889. On August 22 the turntable and engine house was moved from Glen Street and installed here. Charles Hallet finished a depot here in November 1872; photographed by Brainerd in 1878. New station building erected 1909.
It was rebuilt in November 1872, remodeled in 1885, and rebuilt again in December 1906, when the second station was moved to a private location. The station also contains an old-style wooden shelter on the eastbound tracks, and a former interlocking tower, known to the LIRR as Locust Tower that now serves as a Nassau County Police Department booth for the Second Precinct patrolmen assigned to the area.

Station layout
This station has two high-level side platforms, each four cars long. A siding just west of the station served the Nassau-Suffolk Lumber until the late 1970s. The Oyster Bay Branch becomes a single track line a few hundred feet beyond the Birch Hill Road crossing at LOCUST interlocking. No bus access is available at the station.

References

External links

Unofficial LIRR History Website
View from Parking Lot
View from Westbound and Eastbound platforms
 LOCUST Interlocking (The LIRR Today)
 Station from Birch Hill Road from Google Maps Street View

Long Island Rail Road stations in Nassau County, New York
Railway stations in the United States opened in 1869
1869 establishments in New York (state)